The Segunda División B 2007–08 season was the 31st since its establishment. The first matches of the season were played on 25 August 2007, and the season ended on 15 June 2008 with the promotion play-off finals.

Group 1
Teams from Community of Madrid, Galicia, Asturias and Canary Islands.

Summary before 2007–08 season 
Scores and Classification - Group 2
Liguilla de Ascenso:
 Pontevedra CF - Eliminated in First Round
 Rayo Vallecano - Eliminated in Second Round
 Racing de Ferrol - Promoted to Segunda División
 Universidad de Las Palmas - Eliminated in First Round

Promoted to this group from Tercera División:
 Deportivo B - Founded in: 1953//, Based in: A Coruña, Galicia//, Promoted From: Group 1
 CD San Isidro - Founded in: 1970//, Based in: San Isidro, Canary Islands//, Promoted From: Group 12
 UD Villa de Santa Brígida - Founded in: 2004//, Based in: Santa Brígida, Canary Islands//, Promoted From: Group 12
 UD Fuerteventura - Founded in: 2004//, Based in: Puerto del Rosario, Canary Islands//, Promoted From: Group 12

Relegated to this group from Segunda División:
 UD Vecindario - Founded in: 1942//, Based in: Vecindario, Canary Islands//, Relegated From: Segunda División
 Real Madrid Castilla - Founded in: 1943//, Based in: Madrid, Community of Madrid//, Relegated From: Segunda División

Relegated to Tercera División:
Racing B - Founded in: 1992//, Based in: Santander, Cantabria//, Relegated to: Group 3
Orientación Marítima - Founded in: 1954//, Based in: Arrecife, Canary Islands//, Relegated to: Group 12
CD Cobeña - Founded in: 1998//, Based in: Cobeña, Community of Madrid//, Relegated to: Group 7
Gimnástica Torrelavega - Founded in: 1907//, Based in: Torrelavega, Cantabria//, Relegated to: Group 3

Teams

League table

Results

Top scorers
Last updated 18 May 2008

Top goalkeepers

Last updated 18 May 2008

Group 2
Teams from Aragon, Basque Country, Castile and León, two teams from Castile-La Mancha (CD Guadalajara and UB Conquense), La Rioja and Navarre.

Summary before 2007–08 season 
Scores and Classification - Group 2
Liguilla de Ascenso:
 SD Eibar - Promoted to Segunda División
 Burgos CF - Eliminated in Second Round
 CF Palencia - Eliminated in First Round
 Real Unión - Eliminated in First Round

Promoted to this group from Tercera División:
 UB Conquense - Founded in: 1946//, Based in: Cuenca, Castile-La Mancha//, Promoted From: Group 18
 CD Guadalajara - Founded in: 1947//, Based in: Guadalajara, Castile-La Mancha//, Promoted From: Group 18
 Peña Sport FC - Founded in: 1925//, Based in: Tafalla, Navarre//, Promoted From: Group 15

Relegated to this group from Segunda División:
 SD Ponferradina - Founded in: 1922//, Based in: Ponferrada, Castile and León//, Relegated From: Segunda División

Relegated to Tercera División:
Amurrio Club - Founded in: 1949//, Based in: Amurrio, Basque Country//, Relegated to: Group 4
Real Oviedo - Founded in: 1926//, Based in: Oviedo, Asturias//, Relegated to: Group 2
Universidad de Oviedo - Founded in: 1962//, Based in: Oviedo, Asturias//, Relegated to: Group 2
CD Alfaro - Founded in: 1922//, Based in: Alfaro, La Rioja//, Relegated to: Group 16

Teams

League table

Results

Top scorers
Last updated 18 May 2008

Top goalkeepers

Last updated 18 May 2008

Group 3
Teams from Valencian Community, Catalonia, and Balearic Islands.

Summary before 2007–08 season 
Scores and Classification - Group 3
Liguilla de Ascenso:
 Alicante CF - Eliminated in Second Round
 SD Huesca Eliminated in Second Round
 CD Alcoyano - Eliminated in First Round
 CE L'Hospitalet - Eliminated in First Round

Promoted to this group from Tercera División:
 CD Dénia - Founded in: 1927//, Based in: Dénia, Valencian Community//, Promoted From: Group 6
 CF Gavà - Founded in: 1922//, Based in: Gavà, Catalonia//, Promoted From: Group 5
 Girona FC - Founded in: 1929//, Based in: Girona, Catalonia//, Promoted From: Group 5
 CE Sabadell FC - Founded in: 1903//, Based in: Sabadell, Catalonia//, Promoted From: Group 5
 SE Eivissa-Ibiza - Founded in: 1995//, Based in: Ibiza Town, Balearic Islands//, Promoted From: Group 11
 Villarreal B - Founded in: 1999//, Based in: Villarreal/Vila-real, Valencian Community//, Promoted From: Group 6
 Ontinyent CF - Founded in: 1947//, Based in: Ontinyent, Valencian Community//, Promoted From: Group 6

Relegated to this group from Segunda División:

Relegated to Tercera División:
UD Barbastro - Founded in: 1934//, Based in: Barbastro, Aragon//, Relegated to: Group 17
FC Barcelona Atlètic - Founded in: 1970//, Based in: Barcelona, Catalonia//, Relegated to: Group 5
CD Eldense - Founded in: 1921//, Based in: Elda, Valencian Community//, Relegated to: Group 6
UE Sant Andreu - Founded in: 1909//, Based in: Barcelona, Catalonia//, Relegated to: Group 5
Valencia B - Founded in: 1944//, Based in: Paterna, Valencian Community//, Relegated to: Group 6

Relegated to Tercera Catalana:
UE Figueres - Founded in: 1919//, Based in: Figueres, Catalonia//, Replaced by: MiApuesta Castelldefels

Teams

League table

Results

Top scorers
Last updated 18 May 2008

Top goalkeepers

Last updated 18 May 2008

Group 4
Teams from Andalusia, Extremadura, the other two teams from  Castile La Mancha (Talavera CF and UD Puertollano), Ceuta, Melilla and Murcia.

Summary before 2007–08 season 
Scores and Classification - Group 4
Liguilla de Ascenso:
 Sevilla Atlético - Promoted to Segunda División
 CD Linares - Eliminated in First Round
 Racing Club Portuense - Eliminated in First Round
 Córdoba CF - Promoted to Segunda División

Promoted to this group from Tercera División:
 Mazarrón CF - Founded in: 1928//, Based in: Mazarrón, Region of Murcia//, Promoted From: Group 13
 Lucena CF - Founded in: 1968//, Based in: Lucena, Andalusia//, Promoted From: Group 10
 Real Betis B - Founded in: 1962//, Based in: Seville, Andalusia//, Promoted From: Group 10
 Algeciras CF - Founded in: 1912//, Based in: Algeciras, Andalusia//, Promoted From: Group 10

Relegated to this group from Segunda División:
 Lorca Deportiva CF - Founded in: 2002//, Based in: Lorca, Región de Murcia//, Relegated From: Segunda División

Relegated to Tercera División:
 Málaga B - Founded in: 1990//, Based in: Málaga, Andalusia//, Relegated to: Group 9
 Villanovense - Founded in: 1992//, Based in: Villanueva de la Serena, Extremadura//, Relegated to: Group 14
 Villanueva - Founded in: 1951//, Based in: Villanueva de Córdoba, Andalusia//, Relegated to: Group 10
 Cerro Reyes - Founded in: 1979//, Based in: Badajoz, Extremadura//, Relegated to: Group 14
 Extremadura - Founded in: 1924//, Based in: Almendralejo, Extremadura//, Relegated to: Group 14

Teams

League table

Results

Top scorers
Last updated 18 May 2008

Top goalkeepers

Last updated 18 May 2008

 
2007-08
3
Spain